The Seeds were an American psychedelic garage rock band formed in Los Angeles, California in 1965, best known for their highest charting single "Pushin' Too Hard". The band's classic line-up featured frontman Sky Saxon, guitarist Jan Savage (born Buck Jan Reeder), keyboardist Daryl Hooper and drummer Rick Andridge. In 1968, the band changed their name to Sky Saxon and the Seeds, with Savage and Andridge departing the band. They went on to release a handful of additional singles, with Hooper also departing at some point before splitting up in circa 1972.

In 1989, the original lineup of the band reformed for a handful of live dates in the US.

In 2003, Saxon reformed the Seeds with original guitarist Jan Savage (who departed part way through a European tour the same year due to ill health). Releasing 2 further studio albums, the band continued to tour the US, UK and Europe up to Saxon's death in 2009.

History

Formation
The Seeds were formed in 1965 following the dissolution of the short lived band the Amoeba which featured frontman Sky Saxon and guitarist Jan Savage.

Saxon, who had relocated to Los Angeles from Salt Lake City and had already released material under several names including Little Richie Marsh and Sky Saxon & the Soul Rockers put an ad in the LA Times for a keyboard player. Having already enlisted former bandmate Jan Savage as lead guitarist and Jeremy Levine as rhythm guitarist, Saxon reportedly contacted Daryl Hooper to recruit him as a keyboard player. After then asking Saxon whether he also needed a drummer, Hooper and Michigan school friend Rick Andridge met up with Saxon at a club and played that same night. They began rehearsing in the garage of Saxon's home in Malibu, California. Original rhythm guitarist Jeremy Levine left early on due to personal reasons.

The band secured regular gigs at the LA club Bido Lito's and quickly gained a local reputation for high-energy live performances.

As a live act, the band was one of the first to utilize keyboard bass. Although Saxon was credited as playing bass on the studio albums and would mime playing bass on TV appearances, they usually employed session player Harvey Sharpe for studio work. On stage, keyboardist Daryl Hooper would perform the bass parts via a separate bass keyboard, in the same manner as Ray Manzarek later did with The Doors.

Recordings and TV appearances
The Seeds' first single, "Can't Seem to Make You Mine", was a regional hit in Southern California in 1965. The song was also played regularly on AM rock stations in northern California (and probably elsewhere), where it was well received by listeners, and eventually went on to become, and is considered today, a '60s cult classic song. The band had a national Top 40 hit, "Pushin' Too Hard", in 1966 and performed the song on national television. Three subsequent singles, "Mr. Farmer" (also 1966), a re-release of "Can't Seem To Make You Mine" (1967), and "A Thousand Shadows" (1967), achieved more modest success, although all were most popular in southern California. Musically uncomplicated with a flair for simple melodic hooks and dominated by Saxon's unorthodox vocal delivery, their first two albums, The Seeds and A Web of Sound, are today considered classics of 1960s garage music.

A major turning point for the Seeds came in 1967. The band's self-produced third album Future presented a grander psychedelic artistic statement and thrust the group forward as torchbearers during perhaps the most creative and experimental time in American pop culture and music history. The more expansive musical style with accompanying orchestration—presented with a gatefold sleeve featuring ornate flower-themed artwork by painter Sassin—was a departure from the rawer tone of the band's previous hits but nevertheless received acclaim from fans and critics as a notable work of flower power psychedelia. It remains a genre curiosity piece today and is regarded as a pioneering effort in full-blown psychedelic rock. Iggy Pop, Smashing Pumpkins, Animal Collective and members of the Beach Boys have all sourced the band, mentioning this album and previous ones as genre classics.

The release of Future in mid 1967 generally marked the commercial peak of the Seeds’ career, coinciding with a major national hit, raucous concerts, numerous live TV performances, as well as prominent guest appearances on the NBC sitcom The Mothers-in-Law and in the hippie/counterculture-themed cult film Psych-Out. The Seeds also recorded another album devoted specifically to the blues (with liner notes by Muddy Waters). A Full Spoon of Seedy Blues, bearing the artist moniker Sky Saxon Blues Band, was released in November 1967. Saxon later stated that the album "was my idea to get off the record label. I thought that if we just came up out of nowhere and did a blues album that wasn’t going to sell, then they’d drop us. I never expected it to sell but it did OK. We never did those songs live except for a week of gigs at the Golden Bear in Huntingdon Beach".

In May 1968 the band released their final LP for GNP Crescendo Records, Raw & Alive: The Seeds in Concert at Merlin's Music Box, which revisited their more aggressive garage rock roots. However, the album and its accompanying single "Satisfy You" both failed to chart nationally. The band was renamed "Sky Saxon and the Seeds" in 1968, by which point Bob Norsoph (guitar) and Don Boomer (drums) had replaced Savage and Andridge, respectively. Saxon continued to use the name "The Seeds", utilizing various backup musicians, at least through 1972. The last major-label records of new material by The Seeds—two non-charting singles on MGM records—were released in 1970.

Dissolution and reformation
After the dissolution of the Seeds, Sky Saxon joined the Yahowha religious group, inspired by their leader Father Yod. Although a member of the Source Family for several years, Saxon did not participate in any of the albums released by Yahowha 13 in the mid-1970s. He does appear on the "Golden Sunrise" album by Fire Water Air, which was a Yahowha 13 offshoot, and later recorded the "Yod Ship Suite" album in memory of the deceased Father Yod. In the 1970s, Saxon also released the solo LPs "Lovers Cosmic Voyage" (credited to Sunlight) and "Live at the Orpheum" credited to Sunlight Rainbow.  In the 1980s, Saxon collaborated with several bands—including Redd Kross and The Chesterfield Kings—before reforming the original Seeds in 1989 to headline "The Summer of Love Tour", along with Big Brother and the Holding Company, Arthur Lee and Love, The Music Machine, and The Strawberry Alarm Clock.

The Seeds remained dormant again until 2003, when Saxon reformed them with original guitarist Jan Savage and newcomers Rik Collins on bass, Mark Bellgraph on guitar, and Dave Klein on keyboards and Justin Polimeni on Drums. This new version of the Seeds went through several incarnations, with Savage departing midway through their 2003 European tour due to his health. Saxon remained the only original member of the Seeds, which continued to tour Europe and the United States.

Saxon died on June 25, 2009, of heart and kidney failure. The Seeds' original drummer, Rick Andridge, died in 2011.  Jan Savage died on August 5, 2020, aged 77.

Legacy and influence
The Seeds have been among the most frequently cited pre-punk influences by American punk musicians since the 1970s. Cover versions of various Seeds songs have been recorded by The Dwarves, Alex Chilton, Johnny Thunders,  The Ramones, Yo La Tengo, Garbage, Murder City Devils,  Spirits in the Sky, Paul Parker, Pere Ubu, The Makers, The Embarrassment, The Bangles, The Rubinoos, Strawberry Alarm Clock, and other artists. Some lyrics in Frank Zappa's album Joe's Garage satirically refer to "Pushin' Too Hard": "You're plooking too hard, Plooking too hard on ME".

On July 24, 2009, members of The Smashing Pumpkins, members of The Strawberry Alarm Clock, Nels Cline and The Electric Prunes performed a tribute concert at the Echoplex in Los Angeles in memory of Sky Saxon.

A 2014 feature-length documentary film about the Seeds titled The Seeds: Pushin' Too Hard was directed by Neil Norman. The film draws on first-hand knowledge of the band, interviews, and concert footage. In June 2017, a "reunited version" of the band (with founding member Daryl Hooper and drummer Don Boomer and adding Paul Kopf on lead vocals) gave their first performance after a viewing of the documentary at the Center for the Arts in Grass Valley, California.  The band continues to perform to this day.

In 1996 GNP Crescendo released Flower Punk, a box set of their first five albums, The Seeds, A Web of Sound, Future, A Full Spoon of Seedy Blues (as the Sky Saxon Blues Band), and Raw & Alive: The Seeds in Concert at Merlin's Music Box, plus several rarities, b-sides, and other cuts (nothing unreleased) as a three-disc collecrion.

Discography

Albums
 The Seeds (1966)
 A Web of Sound  (1966)
 Future (1967)
 A Full Spoon of Seedy Blues (as the Sky Saxon Blues Band) (1967)
 Raw & Alive: The Seeds in Concert at Merlin's Music Box (1968)
 Fallin' Off the Edge (1977)
 Bad Part of Town (1982)
 Evil Hoodoo (compilation album) (1988)
 Travel with Your Mind (compilation album) (1993)
 Flower Punk (Compilation box set - Their first five albums, plus several rarities, b-sides, and other goodies) (1996)
 Red Planet (2004)
 Back to the Garden (2008)
 The Seeds (reissued in mono with unreleased tracks) (2013)
 Web of Sound (double CD mono/stereo reissued with unreleased tracks) (2014)
 Future (double CD mono/stereo reissued with unreleased tracks) (2014)
 Raw & Alive (double CD two concerts, the original without screaming and with crowd, and another earlier studio concert) (2014)
 Singles As & Bs 1965-1970 (compilation album) (2014)

Singles

References

External links
 Homepage
 
 Official website of Sky Saxon and The Seeds – Tribute album details here

Acid rock music groups
Protopunk groups
Musical groups from Los Angeles
Garage rock groups from California
Musical groups established in 1965
Psychedelic rock music groups from California